Daniel Fernandes (born Coimbra, Portugal 30 September 1992) is a Portuguese motorcycle racer.
 Fernandes started his international career in 2006.

References

External links
 

Portuguese motorcycle racers
1992 births
Living people
Place of birth missing (living people)
Sportspeople from Coimbra